Pulakkattu Raveendran (30 January 1932 – 21 June 1995) was a Malayalam–language poet from Kerala state, South India. His anthology of poems titled Pulakkattu Raveendrante Kavithakal received the Kerala Sahitya Akademi Award in the year 1990. His other works include Nakshatra Paragam, Pravasam and Swakshetram.

References

1932 births
1995 deaths
Indian male poets
Poets from Kerala
Malayalam-language writers
Malayalam poets
Recipients of the Kerala Sahitya Akademi Award
20th-century Indian poets
20th-century Indian male writers